Sriranjini is an Indian actress who predominantly appears in Tamil language films. She has done mostly supporting roles in various Tamil films. Her notable works include Alaipayuthey (2000), Anniyan (2005) and Mozhi (2007).

Career
Sriranjini began her career in acting playing a role in the television series Kasalavu Nesam directed by K. Balachander, but made the switch to films after being offered a role in Mani Ratnam's Alaipayuthey (2000) as Madhavan's sister-in-law. Her next role which won acclaim was her depiction of an Iyengar wife in Shankar's Anniyan (2005).

As of September 2013, Sriranjini has appeared in over 54 films.

Filmography

Television

References

External links
 

Living people
Actresses in Tamil cinema
Indian film actresses
21st-century Indian actresses
Actresses in Hindi cinema
Actresses in Telugu cinema
Actresses in Malayalam cinema
Actresses from Chennai
Year of birth missing (living people)